James Wiley (1835 – February 7, 1865) was an American soldier who fought with the Union Army in the American Civil War. Wiley received his country's highest award for bravery during combat, the Medal of Honor, for actions taken on July 3, 1863 during the Battle of Gettysburg.

Biography
On July 2, 1863, during the Battle of Gettysburg, Wiley captured the flag of the 48th Georgia. He was awarded with the Medal of Honor following this action.

Following Gettysburg, Wiley was captured during the Siege of Petersburg and taken to a prisoner of war camp in Andersonville, Georgia. He died at the camp on February 7, 1865.

Medal of Honor citation

References

External links
James Wiley on Find A Grave

1835 births
1865 deaths
American Civil War recipients of the Medal of Honor
People of New York (state) in the American Civil War
United States Army Medal of Honor recipients
Union Army non-commissioned officers
Union military personnel killed in the American Civil War
American Civil War prisoners of war